Gilmore Kinney (June 9, 1886 – December 15, 1916) was an American college basketball standout at Yale University in the 1900s. He was a two-time Helms Athletic Foundation All-American (1905, 1907) and was named their national player of the year as a senior in 1906–07. That year, he led the Yale Bulldogs to their first-ever Eastern Intercollegiate Basketball League season championship title, and was the league's leading scorer at 10.1 points per game. Kinney also played for Yale's baseball team.

Gilmore Kinney was also the older brother of Orson Kinney, another Yale basketball star who was an All-American in 1916–17.

References

1886 births
1916 deaths
All-American college men's basketball players
Baseball players from New Jersey
Basketball players from New Jersey
Forwards (basketball)
People from Ness City, Kansas
Phillips Academy alumni
Sportspeople from Hoboken, New Jersey
Yale Bulldogs baseball players
Yale Bulldogs men's basketball players
American men's basketball players